Anthony Hughes may refer to:

Anthony Hughes, Lord Hughes of Ombersley (born 1948), British judge
Anthony Hughes (footballer) (born 1973), English professional footballer

As Tony Hughes it may also refer to:
Tony Hughes (actor), Australian actor and singer
Tony Hughes (1890–1967), American actor
Tony Hughes (American football) (born 1959), American football coach and former player
Tony Hughes (footballer) (born 1963), Australian rules footballer for Sydney Swans
Tony Hughes (racing driver) (born 1957), British auto racing driver and businessman

See also